Crepidium lawleri, commonly known as the small spur orchid, is a plant in the orchid family and is endemic to tropical far north Queensland. It is an evergreen, terrestrial orchid with an upright stem, dark green leaves and up to ten greenish cream-coloured flowers well spaced along a brittle flowering stem.

Description
The petals are a similar length to the sepals but narrower. Flowering occurs between December and February.

Taxonomy and naming
The small spur orchid was first formally described in 1984 by Bill Lavarack and Bruce Gray who gave it the name Malaxis lawleri from a specimen collected near Rossville. The description was published in The Orchadian. In 1995 Dariusz Szlachetko changed the name to Crepidium fimbriatum. The specific epithet (lawleri) honours Len Lawler, who discovered the species.

Distribution and habitat
The small spur orchid grows in shady places near swamps between Ayton and Cooktown.

Conservation
Crepidium lawleri is classed as "endangered" under the Australian Government Environment Protection and Biodiversity Conservation Act 1999. The main threats to the species are damage by feral pigs, encroaching rainforest and illegal collecting of the orchid.

References 

lawleri
Orchids of Queensland
Plants described in 1984